Orcula dolium is a species of very small air-breathing land snail, a terrestrial pulmonate gastropod mollusk in the family Orculidae. 

Subspecies
 Orcula dolium dolium (Draparnaud 1801)
 Orcula dolium brancsiki Clessin 1887
 Orcula dolium cebratica Westerlund 1887
 Orcula dolium edita Ehrmann 1933
 Orcula dolium globulosa Locard 1880
 Orcula dolium gracilior Zimmermann 1932
 Orcula dolium gracilis (Hazay 1885)
 Orcula dolium implicata Clessin 1887
 Orcula dolium infima Ehrmann 1933
 Orcula dolium kimakowiczi (Brancsik 1887)
 Orcula dolium major Westerlund 1887
 Orcula dolium minima (Brancsik 1887)
 Orcula dolium minor (Moquin-Tandon 1855)
 Orcula dolium obesa (Westerlund 1887)
 Orcula dolium par (Westerlund 1887)
 Orcula dolium pfeifferi (Moquin-Tandon 1855)
 Orcula dolium pseudogularis A. J. Wagner 1912
 Orcula dolium quadriplicata (Locard 1880)
 Orcula dolium raxae Gittenberger 1978
 Orcula dolium tatrica A. J. Wagner 1922
 Orcula dolium titan (Brancsik 1887)
 Orcula dolium triplicata Clessin 1887
 Orcula dolium tumida (Hazay 1885)
 Orcula dolium uniplicata (Potiez & Michaud 1838)
Synonym
 Orcula dolium f. aragonica Westerlund, 1897: synonym of Orculella aragonica (Westerlund, 1897) (basionym)

Distribution 
This species occurs in the following countries:
 Czech Republic - in Moravia, vulnerable (VU)
 Slovakia
 and others

References

 Bank, R. A.; Neubert, E. (2017). Checklist of the land and freshwater Gastropoda of Europe. Last update: July 16th, 2017.
 Sysoev, A. V. & Schileyko, A. A. (2009). Land snails and slugs of Russia and adjacent countries. Sofia/Moskva (Pensoft). 312 pp., 142 plates.
 Groenenberg, D. S. J., Harl, J., Duijm, E. & Gittenberger, E. (2017). The complete mitogenome of Orcula dolium (Draparnaud, 1801); ultra-deep sequencing from a single long-range PCR using the Ion-Torrent PGM. Hereditas. 154:7: 1-10.
 Gittenberger, E. (1978). Beiträge zur Kenntnis der Pupillacea VIII. Einiges über Orculidae. Zoologische Verhandelingen, 163: 1-44, pl. 1-4. Leiden
 Kerney, M.P., Cameron, R.A.D. & Jungbluth, J-H. (1983). Die Landschnecken Nord- und Mitteleuropas. Ein Bestimmungsbuch für Biologen und Naturfreunde, 384 pp., 24 plates.

External links
 Draparnaud, J.-P.-R. (1801). Tableau des mollusques terrestres et fluviatiles de la France. Montpellier / Paris (Renaud / Bossange, Masson & Besson). 1-116.
  Josef Harl & Anatoly Schileyko & Helmut Sattmann (2011) - Types of the extant taxa of the landsnail genus Orcula HELD 1837 (Gastropoda: Stylommatophora: Orculidae); Archiv für Molluskenkunde 140(2):175-199; DOI:10.1127/arch.moll/1869-0963/140/175-199

Orcula
Gastropods described in 1801